Kochi Metro Rail Limited, abbreviated to KMRL, is a centre-state public sector company in Kochi, Kerala, India, that operates the Kochi Metro and Kochi Water Metro. The company was  incorporated on 2 August 2011.

History 
Kochi Metro Rail Limited is responsible for the implementation, operation and maintenance of Kochi Metro Rail Project and Kochi Water Metro Project as per orders from the Planning Commission and the Union Government. KMRL is a joint venture company with equal equity contribution of Government of India and Government of Kerala.

Projects

Kochi Metro

Initially the project was Phase -I, Aluva to Petta and Phase -II JLN Stadium to Info Park. In Phase-I, KMRL proposed to have 22 stations covering a distance of 25 km from Aluva to Petta. KMRL now has 24 operational stations covering a distance of 18.4 km from Aluva to Maharajas College. Again the project extended from Petta to SN Junction as Phase IA. The Phase -III from Aluva to Angamaly is pending for approval.

Kochi Water Metro

Kochi Water Metro is the first ever water metro project in India. It is a 76 Km long integrated transport system connecting 10 islands with mainland Ernakulam city through a network of 16 routes comprising 38 stations.

See also 
 Transport in Kochi
 Kochi Water Metro
 Kochi Metro

References 

Kochi Metro
Indian companies established in 2011
Companies based in Kochi
Rapid transit companies of India
Transport companies established in 2011
2011 establishments in Kerala